The 1887–88 season was the 15th season of competitive football in Scotland. This season saw two further additions to the list of regional competitions with the inaugural playing of the Glasgow Cup and the Aberdeenshire Cup.

Honours

Cup honours

National

County

Scotland national team

Notes

References

External links
Scottish Football Historical Archive
Scottish Junior Football Association

 
Seasons in Scottish football